Frederick James Tollemache (16 April 1804 – 2 July 1888, Ham House) was a British gentleman and politician. He was the fifth son of William Tollemache, Lord Huntingtower and Catherine Gray.

Through the interest of his father, he was several times Member of Parliament for Grantham from 1826 to 1874.

On 26 August 1831, he married Sarah-Maria Bomford (d. 1835), by whom he had one daughter:
Louisa Maria Tollemache (27 August 1832 – 16 May 1863), died unmarried

On 4 September 1847, he married Isabella Anne Forbes (d. 1850), by whom he had one daughter, the writer:
Ada Maria Katherine Tollemache (21 June 1848 – 6 January 1928), married on 9 May 1868 at Ham House to Charles Hanbury-Tracy, 4th Baron Sudeley.

He was a director of the New Zealand Company, and Manners Street, in Wellington, New Zealand is named for him. (His family did not adopt the surname of Tollemache until 1821).

References
Descendants of Sir Robert de Manners, of Etal

External links 

1804 births
1888 deaths
Members of the Parliament of the United Kingdom for English constituencies
UK MPs 1826–1830
UK MPs 1837–1841
UK MPs 1841–1847
UK MPs 1847–1852
UK MPs 1857–1859
UK MPs 1859–1865
UK MPs 1868–1874
Younger sons of baronets
Younger sons of barons
Frederick James Tollemache